Coblynau are mythical gnome-like creatures that are said to haunt the mines and quarries of Wales and areas of Welsh settlement in America.

Like the Knockers of Cornish folklore they often help miners to the richest veins of ore or other treasures by their peculiar knocking sound. They appear dressed in miniature mining outfits, work constantly but never finish their task. They are said to be half a yard (1.5 ft) tall, very ugly, but often friendly and helpful.

The word Coblynau is related to the English word Goblin and may derive from a Germanic source akin to the German Kobold, via the French Gobelin.

Coblynau are mentioned in the Constantine episode "The Darkness Beneath", but the description of the creatures given is closer to knockers.

See also
 Bluecap
 Gnome
 Knocker (folklore)

References

Welsh legendary creatures
Welsh folklore
Mining in Wales
Gnomes